Kappa Alpha Pi or KAPi (pronounced "Kap-ee") is a gender inclusive pre-law fraternity that began at The University of Michigan.

Declaration of Purpose
"The purpose of this Fraternity shall be to foster knowledge of the law for undergraduate students; to provide service to the greater community and campus; to promote a strong sense of fraternalism among members; to uphold the ideals and integrity of Kappa Alpha Pi Pre-Law Co-ed Fraternity; so that each member may advance his or her intellect while contributing actively to the well-being of others."

Fraternity Organization and Leadership
Kappa Alpha Pi is comprised nationally of almost 200 active members and is growing each semester with new pledge classes. While the size of each pledge class varies, the classes bond through their interest in the law, experiences they share, and the process of becoming members of Kappa Alpha Pi.

The Executive Board leads the fraternity and each new pledge class.  Though officer structure varies across chapters, the Executive Board consists of the President, Vice President, Secretary, Treasurer, Pledge Trainer (New Member Educator), Executive Coordinator,  Service Chair, Fundraising Chair, Professional Development Chair, Social Chair, Big-Little Sib Chair, and a Historian/Webmaster. Officer structure and membership totals are chapter dependent.

Big-Little pairings and "families" within KAPi help strengthen the bonds of fraternalism that transcends normal friendships. The relationships that begin in the fraternity continue on throughout a brother's life and legal career.

Campus Involvement and Programming

Though individual chapters of Kappa Alpha Pi plan their own campus programs, general events include preparation for the Law School Admission Test (LSAT) and information regarding the law school application process and legal careers.  As stated in the Alpha chapter by-laws, "Kappa Alpha Pi holds weekly meetings with speakers from various areas of the law. Kappa Alpha Pi also offers a wide variety of professional development activities, such as resume workshops, personal statement workshops, dean panels, and mentorship programs with students from the Law School. Kappa Alpha Pi also works extensively with the Career Center, Kaplan, Inc., and Princeton Review to ensure our members affordable and valuable support in their law school endeavors." The organization also does philanthropic work, such as participating in Professional Greek Week to raise support for local charities.

Collegiate chapters
Collegiate chapters of Kappa Alpha Pi:
 Alpha - University of Michigan - 
 Beta - University of California, Los Angeles - Fall 2009
 Gamma - University of California, Riverside - Fall 2010 
 Delta - Cornell University - Spring 2011
 Epsilon - Chapman University - Fall 2011
 Zeta - University at Albany - Spring 2012
 Eta - Michigan State University - Fall 2013
 Theta - University of California, Davis Fall 2014
 Iota - University of California, Berkeley - Spring 2014
 Kappa - University of California, San Diego - Spring 2018
 Lambda - University of Tennessee, Knoxville - Spring 2019
 Mu - University of Illinois at Urbana Champaign - Spring 2019
 Nu -Lincoln University of Missouri - Fall 2020
 Xi - Emory University - Spring 2023

See also 
 Order of the Coif (honor society, law)
 The Order of Barristers (honor society, law; litigation)
 Phi Delta Phi (honor society, law; was a professional fraternity)
 Alpha Phi Sigma (honor society, criminal justice)
 Lambda Epsilon Chi (honor society, paralegal)
 Professional fraternities and sororities

References

Student organizations established in 2007
2007 establishments in Michigan